Faisel Al-Jamaan (born June 12, 1986) is a Saudi football player who plays a striker for Al-Jeel.

Honours
Al-Hilal
 Saudi Professional League: 2010–11
Hajer
 Saudi First Division: 2013–14
Al-Ettifaq
 Saudi First Division: 2015–16

References

1986 births
Living people
Sportspeople from Riyadh
Saudi Arabian footballers
Al-Fateh SC players
Al Hilal SFC players
Hajer FC players
Ettifaq FC players
Al-Ain FC (Saudi Arabia) players
Al-Jabalain FC players
Al Jeel Club players
Saudi First Division League players
Saudi Professional League players
Saudi Second Division players
Association football forwards